War (German:Der Krieg) is the title of two oil paintings on the same theme completed in quick succession in 1896 by the Swiss Symbolist painter Arnold Böcklin. The first version (see right) is in the collection of the Galerie Neue Meister, Dresden and the second, defined as unfinished, in the Kunsthaus Zürich in Switzerland.

Painted when Böcklin was 69 and living in difficult circumstances in Italy, the pictures appear to express a disillusioned yet prophetic view of the future of mankind. They hark back in concept to Albrecht Dürer's famous woodcut of The Four Horsemen of the Apocalypse (c. 1497–98), based on the apocryphal .

The first version depicts four riders, including War, Pestilence, and Death, riding furiously through the air above a classical city. In the second version the number of riders is simplified to three and the landscape replaced by a medieval town. 

Böcklin would revisit his vision of global plague in his painting Plague, executed in 1898.

References

1896 paintings
Paintings by Arnold Böcklin
Paintings in the Galerie Neue Meister
Paintings in the collection of the Kunsthaus Zürich
Unfinished paintings